Toninelli is an Italian surname. Notable people with the surname include:
 Cristina Toninelli, Italian mathematician
 Danilo Toninelli (born 1974), Italian politician
 Dario Toninelli (born 1992), Italian footballer
 Marcello Toninelli (born 1950), Italian comics writer

Italian-language surnames